The Old Shades is a Grade II listed public house at 37–39 Whitehall, London SW1.

It was built in 1898 by the architects Treadwell and Martin.

, it is operated by the Young's pub chain.

References

External links
 
 

Grade II listed pubs in the City of Westminster